Kim Marie Peyton (January 26, 1957 – December 13, 1986), also known by her married name Kim McDonald, was an American swimmer and Olympic gold medalist at the 1976 Summer Olympics.  She was inducted into the Oregon Sports Hall of Fame in 1989, three years after her death at age 29 from a brain tumor.

Youth and high school
Peyton set three national swimming records when she was only 9 and 10 years old.

She swam for the David Douglas High School Swim Club in Portland, Oregon, where she held numerous Oregon Class 4A swim records including 200-yard medley relay (1974, 1975, 1976); 200-yard freestyle (1972, 1974, 1975); 50-yard freestyle (1971); 100-yard freestyle (1972, 1974); 500-yard freestyle (1975); 200-yard freestyle relay (1971, 1972); 400-yard freestyle relay (1974, 1975); 400-yard freestyle (1971).

Oregon Girls Swimming Title
Peyton broke her own Oregon 17–18 girls 400-meter freestyle record on August 1, 1974.  This record time of 4:20.35 was to stand until July 26, 1997, when Lauren Thies set a new time of 4:15.97.

Pan American Games
She participated in two Pan American Games: in 1971 Pan American Games in Cali, Colombia, and the 1975 Pan American Games in Mexico City.  In 1971, she won a gold medal in the 200m freestyle; in 1975, she won four gold medals: in the 100m freestyle, the 200m freestyle, the 4 × 100 m freestyle relay, and the 4 × 100 m medley relay. She was chosen as United States' flag bearer for the closing ceremonies of the 1975 games held at Aztec Stadium.

Olympics
Peyton represented the United States at the 1972 Summer Olympics in Munich as a backup swimmer. In the 1976 Summer Olympics in Montreal, Quebec, she won a gold medal in the 4×100-meter freestyle relay with teammates Jill Sterkel, Shirley Babashoff, and Wendy Boglioli, setting a new world record with a time of 3:44.82.  This record would stand until August 26, 1978, when another United States swim team of Cynthia Woodhead, Jill Sterkel, Stephanie Elkins and Tracy Caulkins broke it with a time of 3:43.43 in West Berlin.

Stanford University
Peyton attended Stanford University, where she swam for the Stanford Cardinal swimming and diving team.  At Stanford, she met her husband Drew McDonald, who won a silver medal as a member of the 1984 U.S. Olympic water polo team.

Oregon Sports Hall of Fame
Peyton-McDonald was honored in 1975 with the Bill Hayward Johnny Carpenter Prep athlete of the year award as the Outstanding Amateur Athlete in Oregon. In 1989, she was inducted posthumously into the Oregon Sports Hall of Fame.

Death
Peyton-McDonald died on December 13, 1986, at the age of 29 as a result of an inoperable brain tumor that she first disclosed to the public in 1979.

See also

 List of Olympic medalists in swimming (women)
 List of Stanford University people
 List of World Aquatics Championships medalists in swimming (women)
 World record progression 4 × 100 metres freestyle relay

References

Bibliography 

 De George, Matthew,  Pooling Talent: Swimming's Greatest Teams, Rowman & Littlefield, Lanham, Maryland (2014).  .

External links
 
 
 

1957 births
1986 deaths
American female freestyle swimmers
David Douglas High School alumni
World record setters in swimming
Medalists at the 1976 Summer Olympics
Olympic gold medalists for the United States in swimming
Swimmers from Portland, Oregon
Stanford Cardinal women's swimmers
Swimmers at the 1971 Pan American Games
Swimmers at the 1972 Summer Olympics
Swimmers at the 1975 Pan American Games
Swimmers at the 1976 Summer Olympics
World Aquatics Championships medalists in swimming
Pan American Games gold medalists for the United States
People from Hood River, Oregon
People from Stanford, California
Pan American Games medalists in swimming
Medalists at the 1971 Pan American Games
Medalists at the 1975 Pan American Games
20th-century American women
20th-century American people